State Route 877 (SR 877) is a state highway in rural Washoe County, Nevada. It runs along Franktown Road in the western reaches of the Washoe Valley.

Route description

The route begins at the intersection of Bowers Mansion Road/U.S. Route 395 Alternate (US 395 Alt.) and Franktown Road. From there, the highway follows Franktown Road west and then north for about  through the eastern foothills of the Carson Range on the western side of Washoe Valley. Franktown Road comes to an end at a second intersection with US 395 Alt., just south of Bowers Mansion.

According to Deke Castleman, author of the Nevada Handbook (Moon Publications), "this few-mile drive along Franktown Road is one of the state's prettiest scenic valley and foothill stretches of road."

Major intersections

See also

References

877